The 2005 FIFA Beach Soccer World Cup was the first edition of the FIFA Beach Soccer World Cup, an international beach soccer competition contest by men's national teams and organized by FIFA. Overall, it was the 11th edition of a world cup in beach soccer since its establishment with the first Beach Soccer World Championships in 1995. It took place in at Copacabana Beach in Rio de Janeiro, Brazil, between 8 and 15 May. 

France defeated Portugal 1–0 in a penalty shootout, following a 3–3 draw after extra-time, to win their first title.

Organisation
The 12 teams present at the finals in Brazil were split into four groups of three teams. Each team played the other two teams in its group in a round-robin format, with the top two teams advancing to the quarter-finals. The quarter-finals, semi-finals and the final itself was played in the form of a knockout tournament.

Teams

Qualification
European teams gained qualification by finishing in the top three spots of the 2004 Euro Beach Soccer League. The final spot was contested between the next four best teams in a small knockout tournament a few days before the World Cup began which saw Spain win. South American and North American qualification was gained by finishing in the top spots of the 2005 CONCACAF and CONMEBOL Beach Soccer Championship. The other nations received invites.

This was the first edition of the World Cup in which every continent had a representative.

Entrants

Asian zone:

African zone:

European zone:

1

North, Central American and Caribbean zone:

Oceanian zone:
1

South American zone:

Host nation:
 (South America)

Notes:
  Teams making their debut.

Players

Group stage
All matches are listed as local time in Rio de Janeiro, (UTC-3)

Group A

Group B

Group C

Group D

Knockout stage

Quarter-finals

Semi-finals

Third place play-off

Final

Winners

Awards

Top scorers

12 goals
 Madjer
9 goals
 Nenem
8 goals
 Anthony Mendy
6 goals
 Romário
 Benjamin
 Buru
 Jairzinho Cardoso
5 goals
 Belchior
 Ricar
 Alan

4 goals
 David
 Parrillo
 Juninho
 Takeshi Kawaharazuka
3 goals
 Yevgen Varenytsya
 Amarelle
 Dmytro Koryenyev
 Oleksandr Pylypenko
 Sergiy Bozhenko
 Noel Sciortino
 Junior Negão
 Thierry Ottavy
2 goals
 Bruno
 Ricardo Francisco

2 goals (cont.)
 Alberto Acosta
 Ezequiel Hilaire
 Federico Hilaire
 Martin
 Nico
 Seba
 Victor Moroz
 Jonas
 Didier Samoun
 Jean-Marc Edouard
 Jorginho
 Marinho
 Masahito Toma
25 others scored 1 goal each
Own goal
 Valeiro (for France)

Final standings

External links
FIFA Beach Soccer World Cup Rio de Janeiro 2005 , FIFA.com

 
FIFA Beach Soccer World Cup
FIFA Beach Soccer World Cup
International association football competitions hosted by Brazil
Fifa Beach Soccer World Cup, 2005